William Breinton (died 1403/4), of Hereford, was an English politician.

Family
Breinton married a woman named Joan, and they had at least one child, the MP, George.

Career
He was a Member (MP) of the Parliament of England for Hereford in October 1382 and September 1388.

References

14th-century births
1404 deaths
English MPs October 1382
English MPs September 1388
14th-century English politicians
People from Hereford